BUF Compagnie is a French visual effects company, specializing in CGI for feature films, commercials, and music videos.

History
BUF Compagnie (BUF) was founded by Pierre Buffin in 1984. The company originates from Paris, France and has since expanded into two other locations based in Montreal, Canada and Los Angeles, California. The company develops new software advances in visual effects (VFX) and computer animation for feature films, commercials, music videos and special venue projects. BUF's pre and post-production services have earned industry nominations for Best Visual Effects and awarded innumerable technical achievement awards .

Technology
BUF's research and development group is composed of 13 engineers.

BUF is credited with pioneering in the following fields: stereo-modeling and camera mapping techniques in production; the development of motion blur post-process and camera tracking software; creating 'freezing-effect'; conceiving 3D camera movements in a photorealistic environment reproduced by utilizing still photographic images; introducing new software that simulates clothing; producing invisible continuous shots between live action and full CG; advancing singular character animation software; introducing crowd generation and management techniques along with new fluids and solid dynamics systems; creating original tools dedicated to animation and paint3D and launching the 'bullet time' effect created for "The "Matrix" franchise, which was directly inspired by the research carried out by BUF while working on Michel Gondry's "Like A Rolling Stone" music video in 1996.

BUF has an animation studio complex in Pantin, France, which developed the entirety of animation for "Arthur and the Minimoys." of over 1,600 shots  requiring the involvement of 20 supervisors and 100 artists at any one time.  Buffin also customized the equipment and trained his team of artists to work on every aspect of the structure and creation of the company's first animated motion picture.

BUF's commercial division has developed more than 1,000 commercials adopting broad visual methods and technical challenges, to realize the director's vision on the small screen. Commercials for Mercedes-Benz, Lancia, Nissan, Peugeot, Canal +, Coca-Cola and Disney, have also been executed by BUF.

By April 2007, BUF had received 14 awards for Best Visual Effects and 20 additional nominations and accolades in Technical Cinematic Excellence. The company had won eight Clio Awards, the advertising industry's highest honour, and five Music Video Awards for the Rolling Stones, U2, Madonna and White Stripes. Other music video credits include Lenny Kravitz, Björk, Nina Hagen, Terence Trent d'Arby, Air, Emilie Simon, Chemical Brothers, Melanie Blatt, Ginger Ale, Daft Punk, Texas, All Saints and Foo Fighters.

Graphic design is a further extension of BUF's expertise, having executed principal branding campaigns for Disney, Coca-Cola, Citroën, General Electric, Lexus, Paramount Pictures, Studio Canal, Europa and Metropolitan.

As a broadly documented resource in the VFX domain, BUF has been integral to numerous publications, textbooks, industry reference books and manuals, including The Animation Business Handbook, Rendering with mental ray, Monte Carlo and Quasi-Monte Carlo Methods 2004, Cyberarts 2000: International Compendium Prix Ars Electronica, Comic Art of Europe Through 2000: An International Bibliography.

The company Buffin was built into a $250 million business over 23 years. By forming an on-the-job learning Academy for young professional artists, BUF now employs a large percentage of its workforce directly from specialized universities across Europe, with a median age of 25.

BUF continues to carry out numerous diverse VFX projects for feature films. Buffin is also mounting two literary adaptations destined for animated films, one from a Jules Verne novel and another from Lewis Carroll.  In addition, BUF has two live-action projects and two animated sequels to "Arthur and the Minimoys" in development.

Already in discussions with several U.S. entities on this front, Buffin is producing pilots and two motion picture projects in Los Angeles.

Films
This is a list of films in which BUF provided VFX work.

 The City of Lost Children (1994)
 Batman & Robin (1997)
 Fight Club (1999)
 The Cell (2000)
 Panic Room (2002)
 S1m0ne (2002)
 The Matrix Reloaded (2003)
 The Matrix Revolutions (2003)
 Van Helsing (2004)
 Finding Neverland (2004)
 2046 (2004)
 Alexander (2004)
 Batman Begins (2005)
 Angel-A (2005)
 Revolver (2005)
 Three Burials of Melquiades Estrada (2005)
 Once Upon a Time in the Oued (2005)
 Harry Potter and the Goblet of Fire (2005)
 Silent Hill (2006)
 The Prestige (2006)
 United 93 (2006)
 Arthur and the Invisibles (2006)
 Our Earthmen Friends (2007)
 Spider-Man 3 (2007)
 Mr. Magorium's Wonder Emporium (2007)
 Two Worlds (2007)
 Big City (2007)
 Dante 01 (2008)
 Asterix at the Olympic Games (2008)
 Be Kind Rewind (2008)
 Speed Racer (2008)
 The Dark Knight (2008)
 Babylon A.D. (2008)
 City of Ember (2008)
 Ricky (2009)
 Solomon Kane (2009)
 Splice (2009)
 In the Beginning (2009)
 Knowing (2009)
 Enter the Void (2009)
 Arthur and the Vengeance of Maltazard (2009)
 Avatar (2009)
 Arthur 3: The War of the Two Worlds (2010)
 Thor (2011)
 Green Lantern (2011)
 Machine Gun Preacher (2011)
 Dark Shadows (2012)
 Total Recall (2012)
 Life of Pi (2012)
 Omar (TV series) (2012)
 The Blue Elephant (2014)
 Jupiter Ascending (2015)
 Poltergeist (2015)
 Kingsman: The Secret Service (2015)
 Run All Night (2015)
 The Lobster (2015)
 Independence Day: Resurgence (2016)
 X-Men: Apocalypse (2016)
 The Divergent Series: Allegiant (2016)
 Blade Runner 2049 (2017)
 The Dark Tower (2017)
 Kingsman: The Golden Circle (2017)
 12 Strong (2018)
 The Darkest Minds (2018)
 High Life (2018)

References

External links

 

Film production companies of France
Visual effects companies
Companies established in 1984
Companies based in Paris